Georges Géret (18 October 1924 – 7 April 1996) was a French film actor. He appeared in over 80 films between 1954 and 1992. He was born in Lyon, France.

Selected filmography

 The Unfrocked One (1954) - Un militaire à l'Oflag et à l'église
 Les Nuits de Montmartre (1955)
 L'Homme aux clés d'or (1956) - L'avocat de la défense
 Ces dames préfèrent le mambo (1957) - Le policier de Miami
 Le Désert de Pigalle (1958) - René
 Ramuntcho (1959) - Arrochkoa
 Le Caïd (1960) - Jo
 Le Sahara brûle (1961)
 Climats (1962)
 Le monte-charge (1962) - Un homme se disputant au bar
 Diary of a Chambermaid (1964) - Joseph
 L'Insoumis (1964) - Le lieutenant Fraser
 Weekend at Dunkirk (1964) - Pinot
 Mata Hari, Agent H21 (1964) - Soldier #2
 Crime on a Summer Morning (1965) - Max Zegetti
 The Sleeping Car Murders (1965) - Un agent de police (uncredited)
 God's Thunder (1965) - Roger
 La Métamorphose des cloportes (1965) - Joseph Rouquemoute dit Le Rouquin
 The Poppy Is Also a Flower (1966) - Superintendent Roche
 Roger la Honte (1966) - Roger Laroque
 Is Paris Burning? (1966) - The Baker
  (1967) - Marco
 Dead Run (1967) - Carlos
 The Stranger (1967) - Raymond Sintes
 Love in the Night (1968) - Bourgoin
 The Most Beautiful Month (1968) - Cyprien Boromès
 They Came to Rob Las Vegas (1968) - Leroy
 A Quiet Place in the Country (1968) - Attilio
  (1968) - Jean
 The Southern Star (1969) - Andre
 Z (1969) - Nick
  (1969) - Durante
 A Very Curious Girl (1969) - Gaston Duvalier
 The Mushroom (1970) - Kurt
  (1970) - Corsican Adjutant
  (1971) - César Grandblaise
 Biribi (1971) - Craponi
 A Reason to Live, a Reason to Die (1972) - Sergente Spike
  (1973) - Marco
  (1973) - Rémy Scoto
 Le mataf (1973) - Basilio Hagon
 La Punition (1973) - Manuel
 Le Solitaire (1973) - François Gosset
 The Blood of Others (1974) - L'inspecteur
  (1974) - Le boxeur
 Le Protecteur (1974) - Samuel Malakian
  (1975) - Le chauffeur de l'autobus
  (1975) - Rousselet
  (1975) - Le braconnier
 Spermula (1976) - Grop
  (1976) - Le sergent
  (1978) - Le commissaire Lachot
 Cop or Hood (1979) - Theodore Musard
 La Gueule de l'autre (1979) - Commissaire Javert
 Le Guignolo (1980) - Joseph
 Signé Furax (1981) - Capitaine Fauderche
 Teheran 43 (1981) - Dennis Pew
 La Guérilléra (1982) - El Mariscal
 Pour cent briques, t'as plus rien... (1982) - Bouvard
 Salut la puce (1983) - Le poète
 La bête noire (1983) - M. Guyot
 Das Autogramm (1984) - Dr. Gallo 
  (1985) - Patrick Villard
 Exit-exil (1986) - Joachim
 Hôtel du Paradis (1986) - Dr. Jacob
 I ragazzi di via Panisperna (1988) - Francese, amico di ettore
 Stranger in the House (1992) - Ange Brunetti

References

External links

1924 births
1996 deaths
French male film actors
Male actors from Lyon
20th-century French male actors